The Soldier Mountains are a mountain range in the U.S. state of Idaho, spanning northern Camas and eastern Elmore counties. The mountains are located within Sawtooth National Forest north of Fairfield, Idaho. The Soldier Mountain Ski Area is located within the range to the east of Smoky Dome.

Iron Mountain near the western end of the Soldier Mountains has an old Forest Service fire lookout on its summit.  Several road and trails are located in the mountains, which provide for a variety of activities including hiking, off-road vehicle riding, fishing, and hunting.  Most of the peaks can be accessed relatively easily via class one or two routes.

Peaks

Lakes

See also
 List of mountain ranges in Idaho

References

External links

 
 U.S. Forest Service: official Sawtooth National Forest website
 Fairfeild Ranger District Trip Report

Ranges of the Rocky Mountains
Mountain ranges of Idaho
Landforms of Camas County, Idaho
Landforms of Elmore County, Idaho
Sawtooth National Forest